These are the squads for the countries that played in the 1963 South American Championship. The participating countries were Argentina, Bolivia, Brazil, Colombia, Ecuador, Paraguay and Peru. Chile and Uruguay withdrew from the tournament. The teams plays in a single round-robin tournament, earning two points for a win, one point for a draw, and zero points for a loss.

Argentina
Head Coach: Horacio Amable Torres

Bolivia
Head Coach:  Danilo Alvim

Brazil
Head Coach: Aymoré Moreira

Colombia
Head Coach:  Gabriel Ochoa Uribe

Ecuador
Head Coach:  Fausto Montalván

Paraguay
Head Coach: Ondino Viera

Peru
Head Coach:  Juan Valdivieso

References

Copa América squads
Squads